This is a list of all Dutch cyclists who competed at the Summer Olympics. As of 2012 events in four cycling disciplines (BMX, mountain biking, road cycling, and track cycling) have been contested at the Summer Olympics. Dutch cyclist did not compete at the 1896, 1900 Summer Olympics, 1904 Summer Olympics and 1912 Summer Olympics and boycotted the 1956 Summer Olympics.

Dutch Olympic cyclists

References

Cyclists, Olympic
Cyclists, Netherlands
 
Netherlands, Olympic